The year 2002 in film involved some significant events. Paramount Pictures celebrated its 90th anniversary in 2002.

Highest-grossing films 

The top 10 films released in 2002 by worldwide gross are as follows:

2002 was the first year to see three films cross the eight-hundred-million-dollar milestone, surpassing the previous year's record of two eight-hundred-million-dollar films. It also surpasses the previous years record of having the most ticket sales in a single year (fueled by the success of various sequels and the first Spider-Man movie).

Events 
 March 1 — Paramount Pictures reveals a new-on screen logo that was used until December 2011 to celebrate its 90th anniversary.
 May – The Pianist directed by Roman Polanski wins the "Palme d'Or" at the Cannes Film Festival.
 May 3–5 – Spider-Man becomes the first film to earn $100 million in one weekend. This surpassed the previous all-time opening weekend record held by Harry Potter and the Sorcerer's Stone, as well as the previous May opening weekend record held by The Lost World: Jurassic Park. The film went on to earn over $800 million worldwide, surpassing Batman to become the highest-grossing superhero film of all time and Men in Black to become Sony's most successful film.
 May 16 – Star Wars: Episode II – Attack of the Clones opens in theaters. Although a huge success, it was the first Star Wars film not to be the highest-grossing of the year.
 Amélie directed by Jean-Pierre Jeunet wins the 2002 César Award for Best Film, Best Director, Best Music, and Best Art Direction. Amélie also became the highest-grossing French-language film in the United States ever.
 Another French-language film Brotherhood of the Wolf also became the second-highest-grossing French-language film in the United States in the last two decades.

Awards 

Palme d'Or (Cannes Film Festival):
The Pianist, directed by Roman Polanski, Poland

Golden Lion (Venice Film Festival):
The Magdalene Sisters, directed by Peter Mullan, U.K. / Ireland

Golden Bear (Berlin Film Festival):
Spirited Away (Sen to Chihiro no kamikakushi), directed by Hayao Miyazaki, Japan
Bloody Sunday, directed by Paul Greengrass, U.K. / Ireland

2002 wide-release films

January–March

April–June

July–September

October–December

Notable limited-release films 
In addition to the wide-release films in the above list, the following films received a limited or regional release.

#
 13 Moons, starring Steve Buscemi and Jennifer Beals – (US)
 24 Hour Party People, directed by Michael Winterbottom, starring Steve Coogan, Shirley Henderson and Paddy Considine – (UK)
 25th Hour, directed by Spike Lee, starring Edward Norton, Barry Pepper, Philip Seymour Hoffman, Rosario Dawson, Brian Cox – (US)
 28 Days Later, directed by Danny Boyle, starring Cillian Murphy, Naomie Harris and Christopher Eccleston – (UK)
 6 Angels – (Japan)
 8 Mile, directed by Curtis Hanson, starring Eminem, Kim Basinger, Brittany Murphy and Mekhi Phifer – (US)
 8 Women (8 Femmes), directed by François Ozon, starring Catherine Deneuve, Isabelle Huppert and Emmanuelle Béart – (France)

A
 Aankhen (Eyes), starring Amitabh Bachchan – (India)
 Ada Apa dengan Cinta? (What's Up with Love?) – (Indonesia)
 Addicted (Jungdok), starring Lee Byung-hun – (South Korea)
 The Adversary (L'adversaire), starring Daniel Auteuil – (France)
 Alice
 Ali G Indahouse starring Sacha Baron Cohen, Charles Dance, Michael Gambon and Martin Freeman – (UK)
 All or Nothing, directed by Mike Leigh, starring Timothy Spall, Lesley Manville and James Corden – (UK)
 Amandla!: A Revolution in Four-Part Harmony – (South Africa/US)
 Amar te duele (Loving You Hurts) – (Mexico)
 Amen., directed by Costa-Gavras – (Germany/France/Romania)
 Angel on the Right (Farishtai kitfi rost) – (Tajikistan)
 Antwone Fisher, directed by and starring Denzel Washington – (US)
 Ararat, starring Charles Aznavour and Christopher Plummer – (Canada/France)
 Aro Tolbukhin. En la mente del asesino (Aro Tolbukhin: in the Mind of a Killer) – (Spain)
 Australian Rules – (Australia)
 Auto Focus, directed by Paul Schrader, starring Greg Kinnear and Willem Dafoe – (US)
 Avenging Angelo, starring Sylvester Stallone and Madeleine Stowe – (US)

B
 Baader – (Germany)
 Back to Babylon (العودة إلى بابل) – (Iraq)
 Bad Company, starring  Anthony Hopkins and Chris Rock – (US)
 Bad Guy (Nabbeun namja) – (South Korea)
 Ballistic: Ecks vs. Sever, starring Antonio Banderas and Lucy Liu – (US)
 Balseros (Rafters) – (Spain)
 Balzac and the Little Chinese Seamstress (Xiao cai feng or Balzac et la Petite Tailleuse Chinoise) – (China/France)
 Bang Bang You're Dead – (US)
 The Banger Sisters, starring  Goldie Hawn, Susan Sarandon, and Geoffrey Rush – (US)
 Barbershop, starring  Ice Cube, Anthony Anderson, Sean Patrick Thomas and Eve – (US)
 Bend It Like Beckham, starring Parminder Nagra, Keira Knightley and Jonathan Rhys-Meyers – (UK)
 Beneath Clouds – (Australia)
 The Best Day of My Life (Il più bel giorno della mia vita), starring Virna Lisi – (Italy)
 Better Luck Tomorrow, directed by Justin Lin – (US)
 Biggie & Tupac – (US)
 Black and White, starring Robert Carlyle, Kerry Fox and Charles Dance – (Australia)
 Blissfully Yours (Sud sanaeha), directed by Apichatpong Weerasethakul – (Thailand)
 The Blood Stained Route Map (Pimudun ryakpae) – (North Korea)
 Bloody Sunday, directed by Paul Greengrass, starring James Nesbitt – (Ireland)
 Blue Gate Crossing (Lan se da men) – (Taiwan)
 Boat Trip, starring Cuba Gooding, Jr., Horatio Sanz and Roger Moore – (US)
 Bolívar Soy Yo (Bolivar is Me) – (Colombia)
 El Bonaerense (The Locksmith) – (Argentina/Chile/France/Netherlands)
 Book of Love – (US)
 The Box of Life (Sunduq al-dunyâ) – (Syria)
 Broken Wings (Knafayim Shvurot) – (Israel)
 Bubba Ho-tep, starring Bruce Campbell and Ossie Davis – (US)
 The Burial Society – (US/Canada)
 Bus 174 (Ônibus 174) – (Brazil)
 Buying the Cow, starring Jerry O'Connell and Ryan Reynolds – (US)

C
 Callas Forever, directed by Franco Zeffirelli, starring Fanny Ardant, Jeremy Irons and Joan Plowright – (Italy/France/Spain/UK/Romania)
 Carrie – (US)
 The Cat Returns (Neko no Ongaeshi), directed by Hiroyuki Morita – (Japan)
 Champion – (South Korea)
 Chance, directed by and starring Amber Benson – (US)
 Chat Room – (US)
 Chen Mo and Meiting (Chen Mo he Meiting) – (China)
 Chicago, directed by Rob Marshall, starring Renée Zellweger, Catherine Zeta-Jones, Richard Gere, Queen Latifah and John C. Reilly – (US) – Academy Award winner for Best Picture
 Chinese Odyssey 2002 (Tianxia Wushuang)), starring Tony Leung – (Hong Kong)
 Cinema Paradiso: The New Version – (Italy) – (director's cut re-release)
 City of Ghosts, directed by and starring Matt Dillon – (US)
 City of God (Cidade de Deus) – (Brazil)
 The Clay Bird (Matir Moina), the first Bangladeshi film to be nominated for an Oscar
 The Coast Guard (Haeanseon) – (South Korea)
 Common Places (Lugares comunes) – (Argentina)
 Company (कम्पनी) – (India)
 The Confession (Itiraf) – (Turkey)
 Confessions of a Dangerous Mind, directed by and starring George Clooney, with Sam Rockwell, Drew Barrymore and Julia Roberts – (US)
 The Courtesan (Ca-bau-kan) – (Indonesia)
 Crackerjack – (Australia)
 Crazy As Hell, starring Eriq LaSalle – (US)
 The Crime of Father Amaro (El crimen del padre Amaro), starring Gael García Bernal – (Mexico)
 Cry Woman (Ku qi de nü ren) – (China)
 The Cuckoo (Kukushka) – (Russia)
 Cypher, starring Jeremy Northam and Lucy Liu – (US)

D
 The Dancer Upstairs, directed by John Malkovich, starring Javier Bardem – (US/Spain)
 The Dangerous Lives of Altar Boys, starring Emile Hirsch and Kieran Culkin – (US)
 Dark Water (Honogurai mizu no soko kara), directed by Hideo Nakata – (Japan)
 Darkness, starring Anna Paquin and Lena Olin – (US/Spain)
 Dead in a Heartbeat, starring Judge Reinhold and Penelope Ann Miller – (US/Canada)
 Deathwatch, starring Jamie Bell, Matthew Rhys and Andy Serkis – (UK/Germany)
 Dekada '70 – (Philippines)
 Devdas – (India)
 Dirty Deeds, starring Bryan Brown, Toni Collette and John Goodman – (Australia)
 Dirty Pretty Things, directed by Stephen Frears, starring Audrey Tautou and Chiwetel Ejiofor – (UK)
 Divine Intervention (Yadon ilaheyya) – (Palestine/France/Morocco/Germany)
 Dog Soldiers, directed by Neil Marshall, starring Sean Pertwee and Kevin McKidd – (UK)
 Dolls (ドールズ), directed by Takeshi Kitano – (Japan)
 Doing Time (keimusho no naka) – (Japan)
 Dracula: Pages from a Virgin's Diary – (Canada)
 Drunk on Women and Poetry (Chi-hwa-seon) – (South Korea)
 Durval Discos (Durval Records) – (Brazil)
 D-Tox, starring Sylvester Stallone, Tom Berenger and Kris Kristofferson – (US)

E
 Emergency Act 19 (Gimgeubjochi 19ho) – (South Korea)
 Enlightenment Guaranteed (Erleuchtung garantiert) – (Germany)
 Equilibrium, starring Christian Bale and Emily Watson – (US)
 Evelyn, starring Pierce Brosnan – (Ireland)
 The Eye (Gin gwai), directed by the Pang brothers – (Hong Kong/Singapore)

F
 Facing the Truth (At kende sandheden) – (Denmark)
 Far from Heaven, directed by Todd Haynes, starring Julianne Moore, Dennis Quaid, Dennis Haysbert and Patricia Clarkson – (US)
 Fat Choi Spirit (Lik goo lik goo san nin choi), starring Andy Lau – (Hong Kong)
 Fidel, starring Víctor Huggo Martin and Gael García Bernal
 Fine Dead Girls (Fine mrtve djevojke) – (Croatia)
 The First $20 Million Is Always the Hardest, starring Adam Garcia and Rosario Dawson – (US)
 Flower & Garnet – (Canada)
 Frida, directed by Julie Taymor, starring Salma Hayek, Alfred Molina, Valeria Golino and Geoffrey Rush – (Mexico/US/Canada)
 FUBAR – (Canada)
 Full Frontal, directed by Steven Soderbergh, starring David Duchovny, Catherine Keener, David Hyde Pierce and Julia Roberts – (US)

G
 Glowing Eyes (La chatte à deux têtes), directed by and starring Jacques Nolot – (France)
 God Forbid a Worse Thing Should Happen (Ne dao bog većeg zla) – (Croatia)
 Godzilla Against Mechagodzilla (Gojira tai Mekagojira) – (Japan)
 Goebbels und Geduldig, starring Ulrich Mühe – (Germany)
 The Good Girl, directed by Miguel Arteta, starring Jennifer Aniston, Jake Gyllenhaal and John C. Reilly – (US)
 The Good Thief, directed by Neil Jordan, starring Nick Nolte – (UK/France/Ireland)
 The Guru, starring Jimi Mistry, Heather Graham and Marisa Tomei – (UK/France/US)

H
 He Loves Me... He Loves Me Not (À la folie... pas du tout), starring Audrey Tautou – (France)
 Hero (Ying xiong), directed by Zhang Yimou, starring Jet Li, Tony Leung and Maggie Cheung – (China/Hong Kong)
 Highway, starring Jared Leto, Jake Gyllenhaal and Selma Blair – (US)
 Home Room, starring Erika Christensen, Busy Philipps and Victor Garber – (US)
 The Hours, directed by Stephen Daldry, starring Nicole Kidman, Julianne Moore and Meryl Streep – (UK/US)
 House of Fools (Dom Durakov), directed by Andrei Konchalovsky – (Russia)
 Hukkle – (Hungary)

I–J
 I Am Dina (Jeg er Dina), starring Gérard Depardieu and Maria Bonnevie – (Norway/Sweden/France/Denmark)
 I Love You (Wo ai ni), directed by Zhang Yuan – (China)
 Igby Goes Down, starring Kieran Culkin, Claire Danes, Jeff Goldblum and Susan Sarandon – (US)
 The Importance of Being Earnest, starring Rupert Everett, Reese Witherspoon and Colin Firth – (UK)
 In America, directed by Jim Sheridan, starring Samantha Morton and Djimon Hounsou – (Ireland/UK)
 In the City Without Limits (En la ciudad sin límites) – (Spain)
 In This World, directed by Michael Winterbottom – (UK)
 Infernal Affairs (Mou gaan dou), starring Tony Leung and Andy Lau – (Hong Kong)
 Interstate 60, starring James Marsden, Gary Oldman and Amy Smart – (US)
 Intimate Stories (Historias mínimas) – (Argentina)
 InuYasha the Movie: The Castle Beyond the Looking Glass (Eiga Inuyasha: Kagami no Naka no Mugenjō) – (Japan)
 Irréversible, directed by Gaspar Noé, starring Monica Bellucci, Vincent Cassel and Albert Dupontel – (France)

K
 K-9: P.I., starring James Belushi – (US)
 Kamchatka – (Argentina)
 The Kid Stays in the Picture, documentary on Robert Evans – (US)
 A Kind of America (Valami Amerika) – (Hungary)
 Kiss the Bride – (US)
 Kruté radosti (Cruel Joys) – (Slovakia)

L
 The Laramie Project, starring Nestor Carbonell and Christina Ricci – (US)
 Last Call, starring Jeremy Irons, Neve Campbell and Sissy Spacek – (US/Canada)
 L'Auberge espagnole (aka Pot Luck), starring Audrey Tautou – (France)
 Laurel Canyon, starring Frances McDormand and Christian Bale – (US)
 The Legend of Bhagat Singh – (India)
 L'homme du train (The Man on the Train), directed by Patrice Leconte – (France)
 Life Show (Sheng huo ziu) – (China)
 Light Drops (O Gotejar da Luz) – (Mozambique)
 Lilya 4-ever – (Sweden/Denmark)
 Loonies (Loenatik – De moevie) – (Netherlands)
 Lovers' Concerto (Yeonae soseol) – (South Korea)

M
 Madame Satã – (Brazil/France)
 The Magdalene Sisters, directed by Peter Mullan – (Ireland/UK)
 The Man from Elysian Fields, starring Andy García and Mick Jagger – (US)
 The Man Who Saved Christmas, starring Jason Alexander – (US)
 The Man Without a Past (Mies vailla menneisyyttä), directed by Aki Kaurismäki – (Finland)
 Marie-Jo and Her Two Lovers (Marie-Jo et ses deux amours) – (France)
 Marooned in Iraq (Gomgashtei dar Aragh) – (Iran)
 Marriage is a Crazy Thing (Gyeolhoneun michinjishida) – (South Korea)
 Marrying the Mafia (Gamuneui yeonggwang) – (South Korea)
 Mekhong Full Moon Party (Sibha kham doan sib ed) – (Thailand)
 Melinda's World
 Men with Brooms – (Canada)
 The Missing Gun (Xun Qiang) – (China)
 Mondays in the Sun (Los Lunes al Sol), starring Javier Bardem – (Spain)
 Moonlight Mile, starring Jake Gyllenhaal, Susan Sarandon and Dustin Hoffman – (US)
 Morvern Callar, directed by Lynne Ramsay, starring Samantha Morton – (UK)
 Mr. and Mrs. Iyer – (India)
 My Four Children – (Israel)
 My Left Eye Sees Ghosts (Ngo joh aan gin diy gwai) – (Hong Kong)
 My Mother's Smile (L'ora di religione) (Il sorriso di mia madre) – (Italy)

N
 Names in Marble (Nimed marmortahvlil) – (Estonia)
 Narc, directed by Joe Carnahan, starring Jason Patric and Ray Liotta – (US)
 New Best Friend, starring Mia Kirshner and Taye Diggs – (US)
 Nicholas Nickleby, starring Charlie Hunnam, Anne Hathaway, Christopher Plummer, Nathan Lane and Jim Broadbent – (UK/US)
 Noora (The Kiss of Life) – (Iran)

O
 Oasis (오아시스) – (South Korea)
 Occident – (Romania)
 Ogu and Mampato in Rapa Nui – (chile)
 Old Men in New Cars (Gamle Mænd i Nye Biler) – (Denmark)
 On Line – (US)
 On the Occasion of Remembering the Turning Gate (Saenghwalui balgyeon) – (South Korea)
 Open Hearts (Elsker dig for evigt) – (Denmark)
 Den osynlige (The Invisible) – (Sweden)
 Over the Rainbow (오버 더 레인보우) – (South Korea)

P–Q
 Personal Velocity: Three Portraits, starring Kyra Sedgwick – (US)
 People I Know, starring Al Pacino, Kim Basinger, Téa Leoni and Ryan O'Neal – (US)
 Philanthropy (Filantropica) – (Romania)
 Phone Booth, directed by Joel Schumacher, starring Colin Farrell, Katie Holmes, Forest Whitaker and Keifer Sutherland – (US)
 The Pianist, directed by Roman Polanski, starring Adrien Brody and Thomas Kretschmann – (France/Poland/Germany/UK)
 Pokémon 4Ever (Gekijōban Poketto Monsutā Serebyi Toki o Koeta Deai) – (Japan)
 Possession, directed by Neil LaBute, starring Aaron Eckhart and Gwyneth Paltrow – (US/UK)
 The Powerpuff Girls Movie – (US)
 Public Enemy (Gonggongui Jeog) – (South Korea)
 Pumpkin, starring Christina Ricci – (US)
 Punch-Drunk Love, directed by Paul Thomas Anderson, starring Adam Sandler, Emily Watson and Philip Seymour Hoffman – (US)
 Pure, starring Keira Knightley – (UK)
 The Quiet American, directed by Phillip Noyce, starring Michael Caine, Brendan Fraser and Do Thi Hai Yen – (US/Germany)

R
 RSVP – (US)
 Raaz (Secret) – (India)
 Rabbit-Proof Fence, directed by Phillip Noyce, starring Kenneth Branagh and David Gulpilil – (Australia)
 Rachida – (Algeria)
 Real Women Have Curves – (US)
 A Red Bear (Un oso rojo) – (Argentina)
 Reign of Fire, starring Christian Bale and Matthew McConaughey
 Respiro, starring Valeria Golino – (Italy)
 Ripley's Game, starring John Malkovich, Dougray Scott and Ray Winstone – (US/UK/Italy)
 Road Movie – (South Korea)
 Rose Red, starring Nancy Travis – (US)
 Russian Ark (Russkij Kovcheg), directed by Alexander Sokurov – (Russia)

S
 Saathiya (Life Partner) – (India)
 Salomé, directed by Carlos Saura – (Spain)
 The Salton Sea, starring Val Kilmer and Vincent D'Onofrio – (US)
 Saving My Hubby (Gudseura Geum-suna) – (South Korea)
 The Sea (Hafið) – (Iceland/Norway)
 Second Name (El segundo nombre) – (Spain)
 Secretary, starring James Spader and Maggie Gyllenhaal – (US)
 Secret Things (Choses secrètes) – (France)
 Séraphin: Heart of Stone (Séraphin: un homme et son péché) – (Canada)
 Sex Is Zero (Saekjeuk shigong) – (South Korea)
 Showboy – (US)
 The Singles Ward – (US)
 Skinwalkers, starring Wes Studi – (US)
 The Skywalk is Gone (Tian qiao bu jian le) – (Taiwan)
 The Son (Le Fils), directed by Dardenne brothers – (Belgium/France)
 Spider, directed by David Cronenberg, starring Ralph Fiennes, Miranda Richardson and Gabriel Byrne – (Canada/UK)
 Spirit of Korean Celadon (Chongjaui noks) – (North Korea)
 Spring Subway (Kaiwang Chuntian de Ditie) – (China)
 Springtime in a Small Town (Xiao cheng zhi chun) – (China)
 Spun, starring Jason Schwartzman, Brittany Murphy and Mickey Rourke – (US)
 The Star (Zvezda) – (Russia)
 VeggieTales: The Star of Christmas
 Steal, starring Stephen Dorff and Natasha Henstridge – (Canada/UK/France)
 Stevie – (US)
 Stolen Summer, starring Aidan Quinn – (US)
 Stones (Piedras) – (Spain)
 Suicide Club (Jisatsu Sakuru) – (Japan)
 Sunshine State, directed by John Sayles, starring Edie Falco and Angela Bassett – (US)
 Sweet Sixteen, directed by Ken Loach, starring Martin Compston – (UK)
 Sympathy for Mr. Vengeance (Boksuneun naui geot), directed by Park Chan-wook – (South Korea)

T
 Tadpole, starring Sigourney Weaver and Bebe Neuwirth – (US)
 Talk to Her (Hable con ella), directed by Pedro Almodóvar – (Spain)
 Ten (Dah), directed by Abbas Kiarostami – (Iran)
 Terra incognita – (Lebanon/France)
 Timequest – (US)
 Together (He ni zai yi qi), directed by Chen Kaige – (China)
 Tomorrow La Scala! – (UK)
 The Tracker, starring David Gulpilil – (Australia)
 The Trials of Henry Kissinger – (US)
 The Twilight Samurai (Tasogare Seibei) – (Japan)
 Two Men Went to War – (UK)

U–V
 Ultraman Cosmos 2: The Blue Planet (ウルトラマンコスモス2 THE BLUE PLANET) – (Japan)
 The Uncertainty Principle (O Princípio da Incerteza) – (Portugal)
 Unknown Pleasures (Ren xiao yao) – (China)
 Uzak (Distant) – (Turkey)
 Valentín, starring Carmen Maura – (Argentina/France/Italy/Spain)
 The Visitor – (Australia)

W
 Waiting for Happiness (Heremakono) – (Mauritania/France)
 Walking on Water – (Australia)
 War (Voyna) – (Russia)
 The Way Home (Jibeuro) – (South Korea)
 Welcome to Collinwood, directed by Anthony and Joe Russo, starring Isaiah Washington, Sam Rockwell, William H. Macy and George Clooney – (US)
 Whale Rider, starring Keisha Castle-Hughes – (New Zealand/Germany)
 When Maryam Spoke Out (Lamma hikyit maryam) – (Lebanon)
 Where Eskimos Live (Tam, gdzie żyją Eskimosi) – (Poland/US/UK)
 Wilbur Wants to Kill Himself, directed by Lone Scherfig, starring Shirley Henderson and Mads Mikkelsen – (Denmark/UK)
 Women in the Mirror (Kagami no onnatachi) – (Japan)

XYZ
 Year of the Devil (Rok ďábla) – (Czech Republic)

Films released in 2002 by country 
 List of Argentine films of the 2000s

Births 
 January 4 - Tunisha Sharma, Indian actress (died 2022)
 January 20 - Michael Barbieri, American actor
 February 13 - Sophia Lillis, American actress
 February 23 - Emilia Jones, English actress, singer and songwriter
 March 4 - Jacob Hopkins, American actor
 March 15 - Sam McCarthy (actor), American actor
 March 27 - Ty Tennant, English actor
 April 4 - Damian Hurley, English actor and model
 April 8 - Skai Jackson, American actress
 April 16 - Sadie Sink, American actress
 May 6 - Emily Alyn Lind, American actress
 May 22 - Maisa Silva, Brazilian actress and television host
 June 2 - Madison Hu, American actress
 June 3 - Eva Bella, American actress
 June 5 - Lewis MacDougall, Scottish actor
 July 2 - Abraham Attah, Ghanaian actor
 July 24 - Benjamin Flores Jr., American actor and rapper
 July 25 - Shunsuke Michieda, Japanese actor and singer
 August 1 - Oona Laurence, American actress
 August 12 - Iman Vellani, Pakistani-Canadian actress
 August 16 - Talia Ryder, American actress
 August 30 - Raffey Cassidy, English actress
 September 6 - Asher Angel, American actor
 September 8 - Gaten Matarazzo, American actor
 September 27 - Jenna Ortega, American actress
 September 30
Levi Miller, Australian actor
Maddie Ziegler, American actress
 October 16 - Julian Dennison, New Zealand actor
 December 23 - Finn Wolfhard, Canadian actor

Deaths

Film debuts 
 Fred Armisen – Like Mike
 Lake Bell – Speakeasy
 Alexis Bledel – Tuck Everlasting
 Abigail Breslin – Signs
 Sterling K. Brown – Brown Sugar
 Sophia Bush – Van Wilder and Point of Origin
 Henry Cavill – The Count of Monte Cristo
 Priyanka Chopra – Thamizhan
 Kelly Clarkson – Issues 101
 Jesse Eisenberg – Roger Dodger
 Eminem – 8 Mile
 America Ferrera – Real Women Have Curves
 Tina Fey – Martin & Orloff
 Randy Harrison – Bang Bang You're Dead
 Kevin Hart – Paper Soldiers
 Sally Hawkins – All or Nothing
 Kevin James – Pinocchio
 Rashida Jones – Full Frontal
 Anthony Mackie – 8 Mile
 Rachel McAdams – My Name Is Tanino
 Elliot Page – Marion Bridge
 Rosamund Pike – Die Another Day
 Katt Williams – Friday After Next

References 

 
Film by year